Man @ Work is the eighth studio album by Scottish Australian singer Colin Hay, released by Compass Records in July 2003.

Overview
The album is a career-retrospective for Hay: he is best known as the lead singer for the 1980s Australian pop band Men at Work, and roughly half of the songs on this album are Hay's solo studio renderings of works from the Men at Work catalog, while several others are remixes or re-recordings of material from his solo albums.  Some songs are almost identical to the original recordings (e.g. "Be Good Johnny") while others are complete reinterpretations (e.g. acoustic versions of "Down Under" and "Who Can It Be Now?").

The album concludes with a version of "Down Under" recorded with the group Wild Clams.

The album was re-released on vinyl in 2014 with different tracklisting replacing several tracks with new ones.

Reception

AllMusic gave a mostly negative review of the album, saying of the Men at Work covers that "While such acoustic Men at Work tracks as "Overkill" and "Who Can It Be Now?" are quite charming and worth hearing, the pointless re-recordings of "Be Good Johnny" and "It's a Mistake" (which are almost identical to the originals) are pretty darn pointless." They summarized his solo reworkings as "worth hearing, but of course, they're not up to the high Business as Usual standards." They concluded that the album "will only be of interest to the hardest of hardcore Colin Hay fan."

The Associated Press wrote that, "In the best possible sense, Man @ Work is like Colin Hay's cover version of his own greatest hits album."

Track listing
All tracks written by Colin Hay, except where noted.

Personnel
Colin Hay – acoustic guitar, bass, guitar, keyboards, vocals
Jeff Babko – organ, piano, keyboards
Luis Conte – percussion
Johnathon Dresel – drums
Jimmy Earl — bass
Bill Esparza – saxophone
Chad Fischer — percussion, drums, recorder, background vocals
Mario Gonzales – trumpet
Greg Ham – flute
Andrés "Dez" Hernandez – turntables
Eric Jorgensen – trombone
Cecilia Noël – piano, background vocals, vocal harmony
Lee Thornburg – trumpet
Guillermo Vadala – bass
Lyle Workman — guitar
Toshi Yanagi – guitar

Production
Producer: Colin Hay
Engineers: Dave Dale, Juan Pablo Fallucca, Chad Fischer, Colin Hay, Edwardo McKinley
Mixing: Juan Pablo Fallucca, Chad Fischer, Colin Hay, Edwardo McKinley
Loops: Chad Fischer
Drum programming: Chad Fischer
Design: Griffin Norman
Photography: Gregory Cannon, Cecilia Noël
Cover painting: Norval

References

Colin Hay albums
2003 albums